Ampelio Sartor (28 May 1921 – 30 June 2000) was a French rower. He competed in the men's coxed pair event at the 1948 Summer Olympics.

He was the brother of fellow rower Aristide Sartor.

References

External links
 

1921 births
2000 deaths
French male rowers
Olympic rowers of France
Rowers at the 1948 Summer Olympics
People from Montebelluna
Italian emigrants to France
Sportspeople from the Province of Treviso